Sillett is a surname. Notable people with the surname include:

 Charlie Sillett (1906–1945), English professional footballer
 Emma Sillett (1802–1880), English painter
 James Sillett (1764–1840), English painter
 John Sillett (born 1936), English football player and manager
 Keith Sillett (born 1929), Australian cricket player
 Pauline Sillett (born 1949), British swimmer
 Peter Sillett (1933–1998), English football player
 Stephen C. Sillett (born 1968), American botanist

Surnames